The 2007–08 Mid-American Conference men's basketball season began with practices in October 2007, followed by the start of the 2007–08 NCAA Division I men's basketball season in November. Conference play began in January 2008 and concluded in March 2008. Kent State won the regular season title with a conference record of 13–3 over second-place Western Michigan. Kent State defeated third-seeded Akron in the MAC tournament final and represented the MAC in the NCAA tournament. As the nine seed in the Midwest Region they lost in the first round to UNLV.

Preseason awards
The preseason poll was announced by the league office on October 18, 2007.

Preseason men's basketball poll
(First place votes in parenthesis)

East Division
 Kent State (10) 147
  (9) 146
 Ohio (8) 131
  (5) 128
 Buffalo 52
 Bowling Green 47

West Division
 Western Michigan (23) 173
  (6) 144
  (3) 131
 Eastern Michigan 92
  58
 Ball State 53

Tournament champs
Kent State (7), Western Michigan (6), Ohio (5), Miami (5), Akron (4), Toledo (3), Bowling Green (1)

Honors

Postseason

Mid–American tournament

NCAA tournament

Postseason awards

Coach of the Year: Jim Christian, Kent State
Player of the Year: Al Fisher, Kent State
Freshman of the Year: Darion Anderson, Northern Illinois
Defensive Player of the Year:  Haminn Quaintance, Kent State
Sixth Man of the Year: Brian Moten, Bowling Green

Honors

See also
2007–08 Mid-American Conference women's basketball season

References